Bruno Miguel Carvalho Andrade (born 2 October 1993) is a Portuguese footballer who plays as a forward for National League club Boreham Wood.

Born in Viseu, he joined the academy of Queens Park Rangers at a young age, and went on to make a total of four first-team appearances for the club. He has also had loan spells at Aldershot Town, Wycombe Wanderers and Stevenage.

Andrade left the club in 2015 and spent a year with National League side Woking, before joining Boreham Wood in July 2016. He spent two seasons at the club, and scored 20 league goals to help Boreham Wood reach the play-off final. He left after a defeat and moved back up to the Football League by joining Lincoln City for the 2018-19 League Two season, signing on a free transfer. He signed for Salford City in January 2020, and was released in 2021, where he returned to Stevenage.

Career

Queens Park Rangers
Born in Portugal, Andrade joined the Queens Park Rangers academy at the age of 13. He signed his first professional contract with the club in October 2010, with his manager Neil Warnock describing him as "an exciting young player". He made his debut for Queens Park Rangers against Preston North End later that month. He then made his second appearance for the club against Blackburn Rovers in the FA Cup. He replaced Jamie Mackie who had broken his leg. He made a further two first-team appearances at the beginning of the 2011–12 season, including his Premier League debut.

Andrade was loaned out to League Two side Aldershot Town for one month from 29 September 2011. He made a total of two appearances for Aldershot before returning to QPR, where he did not make any more appearances for the season.

Having not made a first team appearance in over a year, on 9 October 2012 Andrade was loaned out to another League Two side, Wycombe Wanderers, on an initial month's loan. The loan went on to be extended until the end of the season, and Andrade made a total of 26 appearances and scored two goals in his time at Wycombe.

The following season, Andrade joined League One club Stevenage on a three-month loan deal on 4 October 2013. In mid-January, his loan spell with the club was extended for another month. A month after it was extended, Andrade would return to Queens Park Rangers in conclusion of Stevenage loan spell.

In May 2014, Andrade signed a new 12-month contract with QPR. On 2 February 2015, he joined Stevenage on loan for the second consecutive season, initially signing a one-month deal. The loan deal was extended until the end of the 2014–15 season.

Woking
Andrade was released from Queens Park Rangers in May 2015. He then joined non-league side Woking on a one-year deal in demand for first team football. On 8 August 2015, Andrade made his Woking debut in a 1–0 defeat to Tranmere Rovers playing the full 90 minutes. On 19 December 2015, Andrade scored his first Woking goal in a 5–1 goal glut over Gateshead, netting in the 58th minute. On 23 April 2016, for the first time in his playing career, he scored two goals in two consecutive games, netting in a 3–1 home defeat to Grimsby Town and in a 3–2 victory over Lincoln City.

Boreham Wood
On 17 May 2016, Andrade rejected a new deal at Woking to join league rivals Boreham Wood on a one-year deal. On 6 August 2016, he made his Boreham Wood debut in a 1–0 victory over Forest Green Rovers, playing the full 90 minutes. Three days later, he scored his first Boreham Wood goals in a 4–1 victory against Dover Athletic, netting both in a space of ten minutes. On 29 October 2016, he scored the winner in a 2–1 victory against his former club Woking, netting five minutes after Ángelo Balanta had scored the equaliser.

Following his debut campaign, Andrade opted to stay with Wood for the forthcoming season and registered his first goal during their 2–1 home defeat on 8 August, against Dagenham & Redbridge. Converting a penalty in the 7th minute. Subsequently, Andrade went onto net five goals in the space of seven games, taking his tally to six goals by the start of September. Following this, several Football League clubs took interest in the Portuguese forward, including Portsmouth. However, after training with the club, the League One side opted against signing him. On 25 November 2017, Andrade registered his tenth league goal of the season during a 2–1 home victory over his former club, Woking, slotting past goalkeeper Sam Mason in the 82nd minute.

Lincoln City
On 24 May 2018, Andrade signed for League Two club Lincoln City on a two-year deal. He scored his first goal for Lincoln in a 3–1 win over Notts County on 25 August 2018.

Salford City
On 13 January 2020, Andrade signed for League Two club Salford City for an undisclosed fee on a -year deal. Andrade's first goal for the club came on 7 November in the first game of new manager Richie Wellens, scoring the first goal of a 2–0 win against Hartlepool United in the FA Cup first round in extra-time.

Stevenage
On 26 August 2021, Andrade returned to Stevenage having spent time on loan at the club in two separate spells. He was released by the club at the end of the 2021–22 season.

Boreham Wood
On 4 October 2022, Andrade returned to National League club Boreham Wood.

Personal life
Andrade's father José was also a professional footballer.

Career statistics

Honours
Lincoln City
EFL League Two: 2018–19

Salford City
EFL Trophy: 2019–20

References

External links

1993 births
Living people
People from Viseu
Portuguese footballers
Portuguese expatriate footballers
Association football forwards
Queens Park Rangers F.C. players
Aldershot Town F.C. players
Wycombe Wanderers F.C. players
Stevenage F.C. players
Woking F.C. players
Boreham Wood F.C. players
Lincoln City F.C. players
Salford City F.C. players
Premier League players
English Football League players
National League (English football) players
Expatriate footballers in England
Portuguese expatriate sportspeople in England
Sportspeople from Viseu District